K. V. Muralidharan is an Indian politician. He was a former member of the Tamil Nadu legislative assembly elected from Thalli constituency as a Bharatiya Janata Party candidate in 2001.

References 

Living people
Members of the Tamil Nadu Legislative Assembly
Bharatiya Janata Party politicians from Tamil Nadu
People from Krishnagiri district
Year of birth missing (living people)